The RCV-9 is an armoured personnel carrier intended for riot control purposes and manufactured by Land Systems OMC (a business unit of BAE Systems) of South Africa.

Production history
It was developed in 1986 as a private venture by Sandock-Austral as an internal security vehicle for protecting high risk areas such as airports. Soon after the company taken over by TFM, it was merged into Reunert Defence OMC in 1997.

Operators

Current operators
  (60)
  (South African Police Service)

See also
 Buffel
 Mamba APC
 RG-12
 RG-19
 RG-31
 RG-32
 RG-33
 RG-34
 RG-35

BAE Systems land vehicles
Armoured personnel carriers of South Africa
Law enforcement equipment
Law enforcement in South Africa
Armoured personnel carriers of the Cold War